Svetlana Germanovich (born 21 September 1986, in Temirtau) is a Kazakhstani rower. She competed in the single sculls race at the 2012 Summer Olympics and placed 1st in Final E and 25th overall.

References

1986 births
Living people
Kazakhstani female rowers
Olympic rowers of Kazakhstan
Rowers at the 2012 Summer Olympics
Asian Games medalists in rowing
Rowers at the 2006 Asian Games
Rowers at the 2010 Asian Games
Rowers at the 2014 Asian Games
People from Temirtau
Rowers at the 2016 Summer Olympics
Asian Games silver medalists for Kazakhstan
Asian Games bronze medalists for Kazakhstan
Medalists at the 2010 Asian Games
Medalists at the 2014 Asian Games
Rowers at the 2018 Asian Games
21st-century Kazakhstani women